Synthetic Pleasures (1996) is a documentary film by Iara Lee that explores the implications of virtual reality, digital and biotechnology, plastic surgery and mood-altering drugs.

Reception
The film has a 17% rating on Rotten Tomatoes, based on 6 reviews. Roger Ebert for the Chicago Sun-Times gave it 2/4 stars, writing, "Seeing it, you may be frustrated because Lee is essentially just a cheerleader. But it will make you think. Or at least you will think you are thinking. If, of course, that is really you."

References

External links
 

1996 films
1996 documentary films
Documentary films about technology
Films about virtual reality
American documentary films
Works about the future
Futurology documentaries
1990s American films